The Who Collection is a compilation album by The Who, released in 1985. It is notable for containing a unique remix of "Won't Get Fooled Again" and for being one of the few compact disc appearances of the extended version of "Magic Bus".

The original vinyl release was a double LP package. On compact disc it first appeared as a double-CD set, then later as two single individually numbered volumes.

Track listing
All songs written by Pete Townshend, except where noted
Volume One
"I Can't Explain"
"Anyway, Anyhow, Anywhere" (Roger Daltrey, Townshend)
"My Generation"
"Substitute"
"A Legal Matter"
"The Kids Are Alright"
"I'm a Boy"
"Happy Jack"
"Boris the Spider" (John Entwistle)
"Pictures of Lily"
"I Can See for Miles"
"Won't Get Fooled Again"
"The Seeker"
"Let's See Action"
"Join Together"
"Relay"
"Love, Reign o'er Me"
"Squeeze Box"

Volume Two
"Who Are You"
"Long Live Rock"
"5:15"
"You Better You Bet" (omitted from CD release)
"Magic Bus"
"Summertime Blues" (Live) (Eddie Cochran, Jerry Capehart)"
"Shakin' All Over" (Live) (Johnny Kidd, Gus Robinson)"
"Pinball Wizard"
"The Acid Queen"
"I'm Free"
"We're Not Gonna Take It"
"Baba O'Riley"
"Behind Blue Eyes"
"Bargain"

Chart positions
Album

References

1985 greatest hits albums
Compilation album series
The Who compilation albums
albums produced by Jon Astley
albums produced by Kit Lambert
albums produced by Glyn Johns
Polydor Records compilation albums